Odonestis is a genus of moths in the family Lasiocampidae described by Ernst Friedrich Germar in 1812. It consists of twenty-two species, which is found in Europe, Russia, Asia Minor, China and Japan.

Description
The wingspan is 30–50 mm for males and 50–60 mm for females. The moths fly from May to June and again from August to September depending on the location. Palpi very long and slender. Antennae with shorter branches in female than male. Legs with very minute spurs. Forewings are long with acute apex. Outer margin obliquely rounded. Veins 6 and 7 stalked. Stalk of veins 9 and 10 short. Hindwing with veins 4 and 5 from cell or stalked. Vein 8 curved, and met by a bar from vein 7. The accessory costal veinlets are numerous and prominent.

Ecology
The larvae feed on Prunus, Pirus, Quercus, Tilia, Betula, Alnus, Ulmus, Crataegus, Salix and Rhamnus species.

Species
Odonestis angulata
Odonestis apo
Odonestis belli
Odonestis bheroba
Odonestis ceylonica
Odonestis divisa
Odonestis erectilinea
Odonestis filigranica
Odonestis formosae
Odonestis germari
Odonestis gisla
Odonestis leopoldi
Odonestis lipara
Odonestis kama
Odonestis maya
Odonestis ophioglossa
Odonestis pinratanai
Odonestis pruni
Odonestis schalicteta
Odonestis vinacea
Odonestis vita

References

External links
Odonestis pruni at Moths and Butterflies of Europe and North Africa
Odonestis pruni at Lepiforum.de

Lasiocampidae
Moths of Japan
Moths of Europe
Moths of Asia